Timothy "Timmy" Horne (born October 25, 1997) is an American football nose tackle for the Atlanta Falcons of the National Football League (NFL). He played college football at Charlotte and Kansas State.

Professional career
Horne signed with the Atlanta Falcons as an undrafted free agent on April 30, 2022, following the 2022 NFL Draft.  He made the Falcons' final 53 man roster after training camp.

References

External links
 Atlanta Falcons bio
 Charlotte 49ers bio
 Kansas State Wildcats bio

1997 births
Living people
American football defensive tackles
Sportspeople from North Carolina
Charlotte 49ers football players
Kansas State Wildcats football players
Atlanta Falcons players
21st-century American people